Gherla is a municipality in Cluj County, Romania (in the historical region of Transylvania). Three villages are administered by the city: Băița (formerly Chirău, and Kérő in Hungarian), Hășdate (Szamoshesdát) and Silivaș (Vizszilvás).

The city was formerly known as Armenopolis ( Hayakaghak;) because it was populated by Armenians.

History 

A clay tablet containing a fragmentary Old Persian cuneiform of the Achaemenid king Darius I was found at Gherla in 1937. It may be connected to Darius I's epigraphic activities  in relation to his Scythian campaign of 513 BC as reported by Herodotus.

The locality was first recorded in 1291 as a village named Gherlahida, (probably derived from the Slavic word grle, meaning "ford"). The second name was Armenian, Հայաքաղաք Hayakaghak, meaning "Armenian city"; it took the Medieval Latin and Greek official name Armenopolis, as well as the German alternative name Armenierstadt. Later, the name Szamosújvár was used in official Hungarian records, meaning "the new town on the Someș". Before 1918, Gherla was part of the Kingdom of Hungary comitatus of Szolnok-Doboka. It was again part of Hungary between 1940 and until the end of World War II.

The modern city was built in the early 18th century by Armenians, successors of the Cilician Armenian diaspora, who had originally settled in Crimea and Moldavia, and moved to Transylvania sometime after 1650. After a two years' campaign by the Armenian-Catholic Bishop Oxendius Vărzărescu, they converted from the Armenian Apostolic Church to the Armenian Catholic Church.

Gherla is the seat of the Ordinariate for Catholics of Armenian Rite in Romania, as well as that of a Greek-Catholic diocese – the Cluj-Gherla Diocese (suffragan to the Greek-Catholic Archbishop of Alba Iulia and Făgăraș-Blaj, who resided in Blaj). In the center of the city lie the Saint Gregory the Illuminator and the Holy Trinity Armenian Cathedral. The main Armenian-Catholic church was built in 1792. The Greek Catholic diocese was created by the Papal Bull Ad Apostolicam Sedem of November 26, 1853, and the first bishop was Ioan Alexi.

A Habsburg fortress was built here and converted to a prison in 1785. During the Communist regime, the prison was used for political detainees (see Gherla prison).

The town is often visited by Orthodox pilgrims on their way to the nearby village of Nicula and Nicula Monastery.

Gherla also had a significant Jewish population which was decimated during the Holocaust. After the war most of the remaining Jewish population left the city. The Synagogue and the Holocaust Memorial Monument are visited by tourists from many countries.

Demographics 

According to the 2011 Romanian census, there were 20,982 people living within the city, as follows:

 15,952 (76.0%) Romanians
 3,435 (16.4%) Hungarians
 735 (3.5%) Roma
 61 (0.3%) others, including 16 Germans (Transylvanian Saxons)

Natives 
 Tamás Aján
 Laur Aștilean
 Mihai Chezan
 Cristian Coroian
 Cyrill Demian
 Adrian Oros
 Gergely Pongrátz
 Silviu Prigoană

References

Sources

External links 

 Armenierstadt  
 Armenians in Romania at the Central European University site

 
Populated places in Cluj County
Localities in Transylvania
Cities in Romania
Armenian communities in Romania